Comparison of orthotics stem from podiatrists having molded custom orthotics to address patients' foot malformations. Over the years they have developed numerous means to create the basis for their molds, plaster casts, foam box impressions, or three-dimensional computer imaging. None is very accurate: all produce proper fit under 80% of the time.

Traditionally, they were created from plaster casts made from the patient's foot. These casts were made by wrapping dipped plaster or fiberglass strips around the foot to capture the form, then letting it dry and harden. Once the cast was hardened, the doctor would carefully remove it from the patient's foot and ship it, along with a prescription, to an orthotics lab which would use the negative of the cast to create an orthopedic insert. Research studies demonstrate that inter-practitioner variability is a major factor in orthotic intervention in treating a single patient and for a specific pathology

Recently, several companies have developed digital foot scanners that use specialized software to scan a patient's foot and create a "virtual" cast. These scans are made by having the patient place the foot onto a specialized flat image scanner that uses light and software to capture and create a 3D model. This 3D model is then electronically submitted (along with a prescription) to an orthotics lab, where it is used to program a CNC machine that will ultimately produce the orthopedic insert.-->

Styles
Manufacturers of these products choose various materials.
Firm supports stay in one exact position.
Flexible supports maintain the arch positions while moving with the foot through the stride.
Soft supports might use materials like foam rubber of varying intensity, memory foam, EVA, carbon fiber, silicone gel or filled leather. Because they are soft, their contour is less relevant. Instead, these tend to flatten, serving as shock absorbers. These give the proprioception of support, causing muscles to trigger in response, without true articulated support of the firmer models. Many shoe manufacturers, including athletic shoes, include similar pads with their shoes. Some products might be rubber pads shaped for a specific problem spot. Some of those could include a wrapping apparatus to hold them in place. Currently, there is a paucity of research providing recommendations on the type of orthotic or material used in its construction for different patient requirements.

The firm or flexible models might require a period of adjustment. Depending on the severity of the arch collapse and the body's previous conditioning in response to that collapse, sudden readjustment can seem painful. Many attribute the feeling to walking on a walnut. It is recommended new users build up to wearing firm arch supports, starting with only a couple of hours the first day and adding an hour each successive day until the foot is adjusted to full-time usage. To mitigate this adjustment period, many manufacturers sell covering pads or have different gradations to build up to solid support. Some manufacturers cover their products in leather, which somewhat moderates the intensity of the correction while also adding to the stylistic look.

References

Footwear accessories